Las Aves might refer to either of two Venezuelan island territories:

 Isla de Aves or Aves Island, an island to the west of Guadeloupe in the Lesser Antilles
 Las Aves Archipelago, a group of islands to the east of Bonaire in the Leeward Antilles

See also
 Aves (disambiguation)